California's 32nd district may refer to:

 California's 32nd congressional district
 California's 32nd State Assembly district
 California's 32nd State Senate district